Michel Duval (born February 10, 1994, in Mexico City) is a Mexican actor, singer, songwriter, composer and model. known for La rosa de Guadalupe, Señora Acero'.

Early life
Michel Duval was born on February 10, 1994, with the name of Michel Dussauge. He is the son of actress and comedian Consuelo Duval. He started acting at a very young age, and during that time he discovered that his passion was art. He studied at the Centro de Educación Artística of Televisa and he also went for a time to the American Academy of Dramatic Arts. He made his debut in the soap opera Lo imperdonable, after appearing in Atrévete a Soñar. He also made brief appearances in various shows in Mexico. He got a role in the MTV Latin America series Último año where he played Miguel Angel Valdez in the pilot episode. After the success of Último año, he decided to move to Los Angeles, California to pursue a new career where he studied acting and was able to start a musical career. In theater he acted in Romeo and Juliet and Pericles in New York City. Among his most recent works was the role of Salvador Acero, son of Sara, in the second season of the Mexican television series Señora Acero, with Blanca Soto.

In November 2018, Duval announced he was leaving Señora Acero to announce his new upcoming show Deadly Class'' which will air on Syfy in January 2019.

Personal life
In August 2016, Duval confirmed his relationship with his Señora Acero co-star Carolina Miranda, until February 2019 they confirmed that they have broken up. In January 2021, he confirmed that he is in a relationship, until May 2021. Currently, Duval confirms he is single.

Television roles

Awards and nominations

References

External links

 

Mexican male television actors
Mexican male models
Mexican musicians
21st-century Mexican male actors
Living people
1994 births
21st-century Mexican singers